Coco Gauff won the girls' singles tennis title at the 2018 French Open, defeating compatriot Caty McNally in the final, 1–6, 6–3, 7–6(7–1).

Whitney Osuigwe was the defending champion, but chose not to participate.

Seeds

Draw

Finals

Top half

Section 1

Section 2

Bottom half

Section 3

Section 4

Qualifying

Seeds

Qualifiers

Lucky losers

Draw

First qualifier

Second qualifier

Third qualifier

Fourth qualifier

Fifth qualifier

Sixth qualifier

Seventh qualifier

Eighth qualifier

External links 
 Draw

Girls' Singles
French Open, 2018 Girls' Singles